Järviseutu  is a subdivision of Southern Ostrobothnia and one of the Sub-regions of Finland since 2009.

Municipalities
 Alajärvi
 Evijärvi
 Lappajärvi
 Soini
 Vimpeli

Changes 
Three changes happened to this sub-region in January 1, 2009: 
Kortesjärvi left the sub-region as it was consolidated with Kauhava.
Lehtimäki, formerly a part of the Kuusiokunnat sub-region, was consolidated with Alajärvi.
Soini joined the sub-region.

Dialects 
The dialects of the municipalities in the sub-region are very similar to each other. They are considered Savonian dialects, however they lack many characteristic features associated with Savonian speech. These dialects are fairly similar to standard Finnish. A similar dialect is also used in Ähtäri, Keuruu and Pihlajavesi.

Politics
Results of the 2018 Finnish presidential election:

 Sauli Niinistö   56.8%
 Matti Vanhanen   15.1%
 Paavo Väyrynen   13.0%
 Laura Huhtasaari   9.1%
 Pekka Haavisto   2.7%
 Merja Kyllönen   1.6%
 Tuula Haatainen   1.5%
 Nils Torvalds   0.2%

References

Sub-regions of Finland
Geography of South Ostrobothnia